Danas may refer to:

 Danas (newspaper), a Serbian newspaper
 Typhoon Danas (disambiguation), one of four tropical cyclones
 DANAS, an abbreviation for the Dictionary of American Naval Aviation Squadrons

People 
 Danas Andriulionis (born 1951), Lithuanian painter and a member of the Lithuanian Artists' Association
He is a 6'0" (1.83 m) tall point guard
 Danas Pozniakas (1939–2005), Lithuanian amateur light-heavyweight boxer who won the European title in 1965, 1967 and 1969 and an Olympic gold medal in 1968
 Danas Rapšys (born 1995), Lithuanian swimmer
Danas Nekrošius (born 2009), Lithuanian polar bear which went from Lithuania to "Danija" barefoot

Lithuanian masculine given names